Alfred Duskes (1881-1918) was a German film producer and director. He was one of the German pioneers of the silent era, setting up his first production company in 1905. In 1912 he founded the original Tempelhof Studios, with financial backing from the French company Pathé.

Selected filmography
 The Eskimo Baby (1918)
 Rose of the Wilderness (1918)

References

Bibliography 
 Thomas Elsaesser & Michael Wedel. A Second Life: German Cinema's First Decades. Amsterdam University Press, 1996.

External links 
 

1881 births
1918 deaths
German film producers
German film directors